Nicolas Reissig (born 7 April 1989, in Oberndorf bei Salzburg) is an Austrian tennis player. Reissig has a career high ATP singles ranking of 344, achieved on 15 July 2013. Reissig made his ATP main draw doubles debut at the 2014 MercedesCup partnering Robin Kern, losing in the first round to Mate Pavić and André Sá. Reissig has a total of 7 singles titles and 4 doubles titles on the futures circuit.

External links

1989 births
Living people
Austrian male tennis players
People from Salzburg-Umgebung District
Sportspeople from Salzburg (state)